White City, Swansea Greyhound Track was a greyhound racing track in Fforestfach, north-west of Swansea, Wales. It is not to be confused with the Fforestfach track on Ystrad Road that was built later and was called the Swansea Greyhound Stadium.

Greyhound Racing started near Pen-llwyn-eithin Farm on 7 July 1928 when over 5,000 attended the race meeting. The first winner was Paddy Braun at 3-1 over 525 yards and the racing was held under National Greyhound Racing Club rules.

The track has been referenced as Pen-llwyn-eithin, Penllenddan and Penwyneiddan which is probably why it gained the nickname White City. The track was located on the east side of Pen-llwyn-eithin Farm and was west of the Crockett Rail Goods Yard Railway. The track is named as Penllenddan Farm, Swansea on the 1946 betting licence lists and is shown as having a capacity of 2,500 people but the track is believed to have closed around the same time and did not appear on the 1947 lists.

The Mettoy (Toys) factory was built in 1948 and covered what was the south part of the greyhound track.

References

Defunct greyhound racing venues in the United Kingdom
Greyhound racing in Wales